Aleksandr Aleksandrovich Panarin (born 29 December 1987) is a former Russian professional football player.

Club career
He played in the Russian Football National League for FC Fakel Voronezh in 2006.

External links
 
 

1987 births
Footballers from Voronezh
Living people
Russian footballers
Association football midfielders
FC Fakel Voronezh players
FC Khimik-Arsenal players